Monopoly wage is a term used by economists to refer to the higher wages earned by unionized workers compared to non-unionized workers. It entails the idea that unions act as coercive monopolies by raising wages other than what they would be if there was competition between individual workers.

References
Heery, Edmund; Noon, Mike (2002). A Dictionary of Human Resources Management. Oxford University Press. p. 225

Trade unions